Śródlesie may refer to the following places:
Śródlesie, Lubusz Voivodeship (west Poland)
Śródlesie, Podlaskie Voivodeship (north-east Poland)
Śródlesie, West Pomeranian Voivodeship (north-west Poland)